The Shisanling Pumped Storage Power Station (十三陵抽水蓄能电厂) is a pumped-storage power station in Changping District of Beijing, China, near the Thirteen Tombs of the Ming Dynasty from where it got its name Shisanling, which means "thirteen tombs". The power station contains four reversible turbines for an installed capacity of 800 MW.

Background
Planning and designs for the power station commenced in 1974 and in 1988, the National Electric Power Ministry and People's Government of Beijing decided to go forth with the project. Construction was initiated that year and by 1995, the first unit was in operation.

Operation

Shisanling Dam

The Shisanling Dam creates the power station's lower reservoir and was an already existing dam. The dam creates a reservoir that can store  of water and contains a controlled chute spillway.

Upper reservoir
When power is being generated, the water leaves the reservoir and falls through two penstocks down towards the power station which is underground and just above the lower reservoir. Before reaching the reversible turbines, the water branches off into four branch pipes.

Power station
The four branch pipes feed water into the four turbines and after it generates power it is returned to the lower reservoir to repeat cycle when operating. Each reversible turbine has a 200 MW installed capacity.

See also 

 List of power stations in China

References

Energy infrastructure completed in 1988
Hydroelectric power stations in Beijing
Dams in China
Pumped-storage hydroelectric power stations in China
Concrete-face rock-fill dams
Underground power stations